Innsbruck Olympics may refer to:

1964 Winter Olympics, IX Olympic Winter Games
1976 Winter Olympics, XII Olympic Winter Games
2012 Winter Youth Olympics, I Winter Youth Olympics